Daniil Vladimirovich Tarasov (born June 20, 1991) is a Russian professional ice hockey player. He is currently playing with Avtomobilist Yekaterinburg of the Kontinental Hockey League (KHL).

Playing career
Undrafted, on June 1, 2012, the Worcester Sharks signed Tarasov to a standard American Hockey League contract for the 2012–13 season to become the first ever Russian-born player to skate for the Worcester Sharks. During his rookie AHL campaign Tarasov scored 14 goals and 14 assists for 28 points in 43 AHL games played, and he also skated in 17 games with the San Francisco Bulls of the ECHL. On April 2, 2013, Tarasov was rewarded for his strong play when the San Jose Sharks of the National Hockey League signed Tarasov to a two-year contract.

As a restricted free agent with his NHL rights still owned by the Sharks, Tarasov opted to leave North America and sign a lucrative two-year contract to return home with Russian club, HC Dynamo Moscow of the KHL on July 17, 2015.

After his sixth season with Dynamo Moscow, Tarasov left as a free agent and signed a two-year contract with Ak Bars Kazan on 28 July 2021.

Career statistics

Awards and honours

References

External links

1991 births
Living people
Ak Bars Kazan players
Avtomobilist Yekaterinburg players
HC Dynamo Moscow players
Indiana Ice players
Russian expatriate ice hockey people
Russian expatriate sportspeople in the United States
Russian ice hockey right wingers
San Francisco Bulls players
San Jose Sharks players
Ice hockey people from Moscow
Undrafted National Hockey League players
Waterloo Black Hawks players
Worcester Sharks players